MTV Vietnam was a music channel owned by Paramount Networks EMEAA, a division of Paramount Global and UTV Corporation, a division of BHD Group and was under management of Vietnam Television until 2015 when IMC became the manager of MTV Vietnam. The network featured domestic and international pop music along with music news features and limited reality television programming subtitled into Vietnamese.

MTV Vietnam was replaced by a domestic version of Nick Jr. at the end of 2022, though the transition occurred sixteen minutes after the end of 31 December.

Shows

Exclusive shows 
 MTV Thích mê (Most Wanted)
 MTV Chart Attack
 Bước Nhảy Xì-tin (X-tyle Dance Move)
 Giải thưởng video ca nhạc Việt Nam (Vietnam Video Music Awards)
 Vietnam's Got Talent
 MTV Tìm kiếm VJ
 MTV Now
 It's Your MTV
 Star @ MTV
 MTV WOW
 Thần tượng đột kích (School Attack)
 MTV News
 MTV Cover
 MTV @ The Movies

International shows with Vietnamese subtitles 
 My Super Sweet 16
 MTV Cribs
 Shibuhara Girls
 Paris Hilton's British Best Friend
 Jersey Shore
 The Hard Times of RJ Berger
 Video Music Awards
 Europe Music Awards
 Catfish
 Underemployed
 The Inbetweeners
 The L.A. Complex
 Young and Married
 Washington Heights
 Ridiculousness
 Pimp My Ride with Xzibit
 Geordie Shore: The Reunion
 BIGBANG Alive Around The World
 Geordie Shore
 MTV Movie Awards
 Pranked

Availability
HTVC
Hanoicab
K+
VTVcab
myTV (IPTV)
FPT (IPTV)

See also
 MTV (Music Television)
 MTV Networks Asia Pacific
 MTV Southeast Asia

References

External links
List of television channels in Vietnam
 MTV Vietnam's Official Site
 MTV Vietnam at Facebook
 MTV Vietnam - Shutdown (January 1, 2023)

MTV
Television companies of Vietnam
2011 establishments in Vietnam
Television channels and stations established in 2011
2022 disestablishments in Vietnam
Television channels and stations disestablished in 2022
Music organizations based in Vietnam